McClain Hermes or often known as Laurrie Hermes (born 5 January 2001) is an American Paralympic swimmer who competes in international elite competitions.

Career
She is a World and Parapan American Games champion in freestyle swimming, she has also competed at the 2016 Summer Paralympics and competed at the 2020 Summer Paralympics.

On April 14, 2022, Hermes was named to the roster to represent the United States at the 2022 World Para Swimming Championships.

References

2001 births
Living people
Sportspeople from Charlotte, North Carolina
American female backstroke swimmers
American female breaststroke swimmers
American female freestyle swimmers
Paralympic swimmers of the United States
Swimmers at the 2016 Summer Paralympics
Swimmers at the 2020 Summer Paralympics
Medalists at the 2019 Parapan American Games
Medalists at the World Para Swimming Championships
Medalists at the 2015 Parapan American Games
People from Dacula, Georgia
Loyola Greyhounds athletes
College women's swimmers in the United States
S11-classified Paralympic swimmers
21st-century American women